Presidential elections were held in Poland on May 8, 1933. Professor Ignacy Mościcki was re-elected for a second seven-year term, having previously been elected to the position in 1926. He was elected by 332 votes, with 11 votes appearing to be void. The result was greeted with loud cheers.

He was elected by the Polish Sejm (Diet) and Senate sitting together as the National Assembly. The National Assembly had 555 members but only 343 were present, mainly members of BBWR, the government party of Marshal Józef Piłsudski. The main opposition party, SN, stayed away, but representatives of German minority and Jewish parties plus three smaller parties (including the Communists who tried to nominate their own candidate but did not have the necessary 50 votes to nominate) were present.

References 
Keesings Contemporary Archives (London) 1933 p787C  
The Times (London) 9 May 1933 p13 

1933 in Poland
Poland
Presidential elections in Poland
May 1933 events